Katabangan (Catanauan "Ayta") is an extinct Aeta language that was spoken in the Bondoc Peninsula of Quezon Province, southern Luzon in the Philippines. It is misspelled Katabaga in Ethnologue.

The Katabangan have completely switched to Tagalog. Katabangan is also used by some people in the Bikol Region to refer to mixed-blood Agta. Zubiri believes it is likely related to Agta of the Lopez-Guinayangan area, and to the Manide of western and central Camarines Norte.

History and status
The language was originally listed by Garvan (1963: 8). Katabaga is in fact a misspelling of Katabangan, the name that the people use to refer to themselves. Some people in the Bikol Region also use the term Katabangan to refer to mixed-blood Agta in the region. Lobel (2013: 92) reports from a 2006 visit that the Katabangan speak only Tagalog. According to Lobel (2013), if the Katabangan did in fact speak one of the Philippine Negrito languages before, it would have been related to Agta of the Lopez-Guinayangan area (see Inagta Alabat language) or to Manide based on its present-day location.

Louward Allen Zubiri reports that there are 670 individuals in the Katabangan community. The community was granted an ancestral domain title by the government of the Philippines in 2015. There are also families living in Mulanay, Gumaca, Lopez, and Alabat.

Vocabulary
Zubiri compares a few Katabangan lexical items remembered by elders and notes clear similarities with Inagta Alabat and Manide.

{| class="wikitable"
! gloss !! Katabangan !! Inagta Alabat !! Manide
|-
! many
| || || 
|-
! rain
| || || 
|-
! tomorrow
| || || 
|-
! to go
| || || 
|}

References

Aeta languages
Languages of Quezon